Phytoecia analis is a species of beetle in the family Cerambycidae. It was described by Johan Christian Fabricius in 1781, originally under the genus Saperda. It has a wide distribution in Africa.

Varietas
 Phytoecia analis var. rufiniabdominalis Breuning, 1951
 Phytoecia analis var. guineensis (Kolbe, 1893)

References

Phytoecia
Beetles described in 1781